JW3 or variation, may refer to:

 JW3, the Jewish Community Centre London
 Nanyang Gateway MRT station (station code: JW3) Singapore mass rapid transit station
 ACA JW-3, the ACA Industries aircraft model JW-3, see List of aircraft (0–Ah)
 Honda Today model JW3, a Japanese kei car
 Jurassic World 3, the sequel to Jurassic World: Fallen Kingdom, sixth film in the Jurassic Park film series
 John Wick: Chapter 3 – Parabellum, third film in the John Wick series

See also
 J3W, see List of postal codes of Canada: J
 JW (disambiguation)